Comedown is a 2012 British urban horror film directed by Menhaj Huda, and written by Steven Kendall. Dubbed "Kidulthood meets Saw", the film stars Jacob Anderson, Adam Deacon and Geoff Bell in the lead roles.

Plot
In an abandoned tower, six friends turn the tower into a radio station and soon learn they are not alone as a resident psychopath begins hunting them down.

Cast
Jacob Anderson as Lloyd
Adam Deacon as Jason
Sophie Stuckey as Jemma
Calum McNab as Gary "Gal"
Jessica Barden as Kelly
Duane Henry as Colin "Col"
Geoff Bell as Ray Grady
Shazad "Shizzio" Khan as Shafiq "Shaf"
Muazzin "Naga" Aziz as Nazar "Naz" 
Gemma-Leah Devereux as Nurse Samantha Harris
Slaine Kelly as Nurse Sally Mitchell
Christos Lawton as PC Jon Murray
Deirdre Mullins as Alissa the Newsreader
Stephen Taylor as the Creeper

Production
Comedown was shot on a budget of $2,000,000, and was filmed in a suburb of London close to the O2 Arena.

Reception

Critical response
Stephen Dalton of The National wrote in his review: " A good slasher film is not about originality or realism, of course, but about execution – no pun intended. As such, director Menhaj Huda does a decent job with limited ingredients. But there is nothing in this pulpy, formulaic nerve-jangler that horror fans will not have seen countless times before."

Release
Comedown premiered on 4 October 2012, at film festival Grimmfest, but was not released to cinemas on general release, and instead was expected to be released direct-to-DVD on 11 March 2013.

References

External links

2012 films
2012 horror films
2012 horror thriller films
2010s serial killer films
British horror thriller films
British slasher films
Hood films
Films produced by Gareth Wiley
Films shot at Pinewood Studios
Films shot in London
Films directed by Menhaj Huda
2010s English-language films
2010s British films